Shin Su-jin (born December 28, 1992), known professionally as Since (stylized in all caps), is a South Korean rapper. She first garnered attention when she appeared on the rap competition TV show Show Me the Money 10 in 2021. She released her debut studio album Since 16'  in the same year which was met with critical acclaim. In 2022, she became the first female musician to win New Artist of the Year at the Korean Hip-hop Awards.

Early life and education 
Shin Su-jin was born in Seoul on December 28, 1992. She moved to Daejeon when she was in third grade. She began rapping after she sang along to Eminem's "Lose Yourself" in front of her friends in high school. She decided to be a rapper after applying for Show Me the Money 4 and Show Me the Money 5. In 2016, she moved back to Seoul to pursue her music career. In 2019, she won Open Mic Swg. She adopted the stage name "Since" as it sounds similar to her real name. She also wanted it to mean that the hip hop scene will change since her debut.

She graduated from Chungnam National University with a bachelor's degree in public administration.

Career 
In 2020, Since released her debut single "New Shit". In July 2021, she released her debut studio album Since '16 which was met with critical acclaim. Its lead single "Spring Rain" was nominated for Best Rap Song at the Korean Music Awards. In October 2021, she appeared on the rap competition TV show Show Me the Money 10. She became the first female rapper to advance to the finals of the show and finished in second place. 

In March 2022, she became the first female musician to win New Artist of the Year at the Korean Hip-hop Awards. In August 2022, she released her debut extended play High Risk High Return.

Artistry 
Since is known for her powerful raps. She expresses her attitude toward life or experiences through music.

Discography

Studio album

EP

Singles

Filmography

TV

Awards and nominations

References

External link 

 

1992 births
Living people
Musicians from Seoul
People from Daejeon
Show Me the Money (South Korean TV series) contestants
South Korean women rappers